USS Sam Nunn (DDG-133) is a planned  guided missile destroyer of the United States Navy, the 83rd overall for the class. She was named on 6 May 2019 by Navy Secretary Richard V. Spencer in honor of Samuel Augustus Nunn, Jr. Nunn was a U.S. Senator representing Georgia, who served in Congress from 1972 to 1997, and was chairman of the Senate Armed Services Committee and the Permanent Subcommittee on Investigations.

References 

 

Arleigh Burke-class destroyers
Proposed ships of the United States Navy